Slanning is a surname. Notable people with the surname include:

Nicholas Slanning (1606–1643), English soldier
Slanning baronets
Sir Nicholas Slanning, 1st Baronet